The 2021 Bolton Metropolitan Borough Council election to elect members of Bolton Metropolitan Borough Council took place on 6 May 2021, on the same day as other local elections.

21 seats were contested, including a by election in Astley Bridge Ward, following the death of Cllr Paul Wild. The Conservative Party won 10 seats, the Labour Party won 7 seats, Farnworth and Kearsley First won 2 seats, Horwich and Blackrod First won 1 seat, and the Liberal Democrats won 1 seat.

After the election, the total composition of the council was as follows:
Conservative 20
Labour 19
Liberal Democrats 5
Farnworth and Kearsley First 5
Horwich and Blackrod First 3
UK Independence Party 1
Independents 7

Election results

Council composition
Prior to the election the composition of the council was:

After the election the composition of the council was:

LD - Liberal Democrats
U - UKIP
IND - Independent (politician)

Ward results
Winning candidates are highlighted in bold.

Astley Bridge

Bradshaw ward

Breightmet ward

Bromley Cross ward

Crompton ward

Farnworth ward

Great Lever ward

Halliwell ward

Harper Green ward

Heaton and Lostock ward

Horwich and Blackrod ward

Horwich North East ward

Hulton ward

Kearsley ward

Little Lever and Darcy Lever ward

Rumworth ward

Smithills ward

Tonge with The Haulgh ward

Westhoughton North and Chew Moor ward

Westhoughton South

References

Bolton Metropolitan Borough Council elections
Bolton
2020s in Greater Manchester
May 2021 events in the United Kingdom